"Under the Influence" is the eleventh studio album by Australian musician, Diesel. The release came about following a string of live dates, in which Diesel performed tracks that had influenced his own material. The album follows the extended play.7 Axes which was released in February 2011 and peaked at number 71. Both EP and album were recorded in ten days in June 2010.

Reviews
Pete Rivas from The Music gave the album 8 out of 10 saying  "With this album, Diesel celebrates 25 years on the scene and he honors some of the key influences in his music, hence the title. Featuring 15 tracks in total, the album includes mostly covers, although these are well fused with 3 fantastic original Diesel instrumentals (Thang 4, Thang 5, Thang 6). Stand out cover tracks include The Sonics' “Have Love, Will Travel” which includes a cameo from Jimmy Barnes and my personal favorite, Neil Young's “Cinnamon Girl”. Other pleasers are “Caladonia” and “Reconsider Baby”. "

Track listing
 "Spanish Castle Magic" (Jimi Hendrix) - 3:08
 "Cross Cut Saw" (R.G. Ford) - 3:10
 "I'm a Ram" (Big Sugar) - 3:43
 "Have Love, Will Travel"  (feat. Jimmy Barnes)  (Richard Berry) - 2:35
 "Thang 5" (instrumental) - 2:54
 "Can't Get Next To You" (Norman Whitfield, Barrett Strong) - 4:04
 "Cinnamon Girl" (Neil Young) - 3:13
 "Thang 4" (instrumental) - 3:05
 "Wind Cries Mary" (Jimi Hendrix) - 3:58
 "Going Down" (Don Nix) - 3:34
 "Reconsider Baby" (Lowell Fulson) - 3:18
 "It's All in the Game" (Carl Sigman, Charles Dawes) - 4:02
 "Caladonia" (Fleecy Moore) - 3:38
 "Rumble" (Fred Wray / Milton Grant) - 2:23
 "Thang 6" (instrumental) - 2:59

Weekly charts

Release history

Credits
 Bass – Richie Vez
 Drums – Lee Moloney
 Guitar/Vocals – Mark Lizotte

External links

References

2011 albums
Diesel (musician) albums
Liberation Records albums